William Beale    was Archdeacon of Carmarthen from 1625 until his death on 1 October 1651.

Beale was educated at Trinity College, Cambridge. In 1611 he became a Fellow of Jesus College, Cambridge. He was Master of St John's College, Cambridge from 1634 to 1644; and Vice Chancellor of Cambridge University from 1634 to 1635. He held livings in Cottingham, Carlton, Paulerspury and Aberdaron.

References

1651 deaths
People educated at Llandovery College
Alumni of Trinity College, Cambridge
Alumni of Jesus College, Cambridge
Masters of St John's College, Cambridge
Vice-Chancellors of the University of Cambridge
Archdeacons of Carmarthen